Posolskoye is a rural locality (a selo) in Kabansky District, Republic of Buryatia, Russia. The population was 782 as of 2010. There are 9 streets.

Geography 
Posolskoye is located 42 km west of Kabansk (the district's administrative centre) by road. Bolshaya Rechka is the nearest rural locality.

References 

Rural localities in Kabansky District
Populated places on Lake Baikal